"Summer Days" is a song written by Tony Romeo.  The song was originally recorded in 1971 by The Partridge Family on their Sound Magazine album, but was not released as a single.

Lou Christie cover
Lou Christie recorded "Summer Days" in 1975.  It was released as a non-album single. 

The song reached No. 89 on the Record World chart and No. 112 on Cash Box.

Chart history

Other versions
David Cassidy recorded a solo version of "Summer Days" on his 1973 LP Dreams Are Nuthin' More Than Wishes.

References

External links
 
 

1971 songs
1975 singles
Lou Christie songs
The Partridge Family songs
Songs written by Tony Romeo
Bell Records singles
Elektra Records singles